Celebration is a Canadian music television series which aired on CBC Television from 1975 to 1976.

Premise
Tommy Ambrose hosted this series of inspirational music with the eight-member house group, the Celebration Choir. Doug Riley provided musical arrangements. Episodes included interviews on spirituality-related topics.

Scheduling
This half-hour series was broadcast on Tuesdays at 7:30 p.m. (Eastern) from 23 September 1975 to 25 May 1976.

References

External links
 

CBC Television original programming
1975 Canadian television series debuts
1976 Canadian television series endings